Bramanville Mill, also known as Chickering Grist Mill, is a historic grist mill located at Cobleskill in Schoharie County, New York.

Characteristics
The mill building is a 30 foot by 50 foot, rectangular, gable roofed wood-frame building, two and one half stories on the end facing the road.

Historic Places
It was listed on the National Register of Historic Places in 1976.

See also
 Historic Places in the USA

References

Grinding mills on the National Register of Historic Places in New York (state)
Buildings and structures in Schoharie County, New York
Grinding mills in New York (state)
National Register of Historic Places in Schoharie County, New York